also known as Jirō Chiba is a retired Japanese actor. His older brother is Sonny Chiba. He is known for playing the role of Kazuya Taki in the tokusatsu superhero series Kamen Rider.

He started his acting career at the Bungakuza theatre company in 1967. In 1970, he joined Sonny Chiba's production company and often co-starred with Sonny in many films. His first starring role in the film was in Gekitotsu! Aikidō. In 1976, he changed his stage name from Jirō Chiba to Jirō Yabuki.

He announced his retirement as an actor in 1982.

Filmography

Film

The Assassin (1970) as Jirō
 (1971)
Kigeki Ijiwaru Daishōgai (1971)
Kamen Rider vs. Shocker (1972) as Kazuya Taki
Kamen Rider vs. Ambassador Hell (1972) as Kazuya Taki
The Street Fighter (1974) as Gijun Shikenbaru
The Bullet Train (1975) as Officer
Champion of Death (1975) as Ogano Genpachirō
The Return of the Sister Street Fighter (1975) as Xiang De-Ki (Sho Tokki)
 (1975) as Morihei Ueshiba
Machine Gun Dragon (1976) as Jirō Segawa
Dragon Princess (1976) as Jirō Chinen
The Rugby Star (1976) as Jirō Yabuki
 (1976) as Makoto Karaki
Terror of Yakuza (1976) as Tetsuo Chibana
Yakuza Graveyard (1976) as Hideo Wakamoto
Hokuriku Proxy War (1976) as Hanamaki
Tree of Youth (1977) as Hiroshi Waku
Circuit no Ōkami (1977) as Okita
Yakuza Sensō Nihonno Don (1977) as Gundai Harita
Sanshiro Sugata (1977) as Tesshin Higaki
Shogun's Samurai (1978) as Yagyū Samon Taira-no-Tomonori 
The Okinawa War of Ten Years (1978) as Noboru Ishiura
Kagemusha (1980) as Equestrian
The Battle of Port Arthur (1980) as Kuji
The Blazing Valiant (1981) as Fumio Sakamoto 
Eijanaika (1981) as Senmatsu
The Gate of Youth (1982) as Ryuji Hamazaki
Farewell to the Land (1982) as Akihiko Yamazawa
Tattoo Ari (1982) as Teruya Shimada

Television

Ōedo Sōsamō (1971) (Guest ep.25) as Sakichi
Kamen Rider (1971) as Kazuya Taki
Kikaider 01 (1974) (Guest ep.43 and 44) as Eisuke Tōge
Robot Detective (1973) as Tsuyoshi Shinjō
The Bodyguard (1974) as Jirō Kurata
The Gorilla Seven (1975) as Tadashi Mannen
Akumaizer 3 (1975) as Ippei Shima
Kaiketsu Zubat (1977) (Guest ep.31 and 32) 
G-Men '75 (1977, 1979) (Guest ep.128 and 221)
Daitokai season2 (1978) (Guest ep.47) as Akira Sugiyama
Taiyō ni Hoero! (1978, 1981) (Guest ep.312 and 488)
Ōgon no Hibi (1978) as Hattori Hanzō
The Yagyu Conspiracy (1978) as Fuchikari
Doberman Deka (1980) as Kyosuke Hirata
Hissatsu Shigotonin (1980) (Guest ep.75) as Einoshin Tachiki
Seibu Keisatsu (1981) (Guest ep.104) as Noboru Akimoto
Kage no Gundan season2 (1981) (Guest ep.7) as Kikumaru

References

External links

1949 births
Japanese male film actors
Japanese male television actors
20th-century Japanese male actors
Living people
Actors from Chiba Prefecture